Finger Eleven is the third studio album by the Canadian rock band Finger Eleven from Burlington, Ontario. The sounds on this album range from grunge and prog-rock to Electric Six-style disco metal. Because of its commercial success, they were welcomed to the SnoCore 2004 tour. "One Thing" became the biggest single from this record, reaching 16 on the Billboard Hot 100. It was also played consistently on rock radio and MTV. Some of the songs have been featured in various EA games including "Stay in Shadow" (Burnout 3) and "Good Times" (SSX3). In a similar vein, "Other Light", "Conversations", and "Good Times" have all appeared in the GameCube game 1080° Avalanche.

During the recording of this album, there were rumors of the band breaking up. Finger Eleven then posted a cell-phone number for fans to call at any point, twenty-four hours a day, to talk to anyone in the group.

There was a limited edition version of the CD, which came with a bonus DVD featuring the "Good Times" music video, studio footage, and a live concert video.

Commercial performance
Finger Eleven debuted at #4 on the Canadian Albums Chart, the band's highest position on that chart in their history at the time. The album sold 8,300 copies in Canada in its first week. Finger Eleven was also the band's most successful album yet in the United States, reaching #1 on the Top Heatseekers chart and appearing on the Billboard 200, peaking at #96 in 2004. The album was certified Platinum in Canada and Gold in the United States, making it the band's first album to receive a certification in the U.S.

Track listing

B-sides
"Unspoken" – 3:37
"Wake Up Demons" – 2:16
"Murder My Mind's Eye" – 4:18
"Tearing Disguises" – 6:17
"Sad Exchange" (from Daredevil: The Album soundtrack) — 3:32

Personnel
Scott Anderson - vocals
James Black - guitar, vocals
Rick Jackett - guitar
Sean Anderson - bass
Rich Beddoe - drums

Chart positions

Weekly charts

Year-end charts

Singles

References

2003 albums
Finger Eleven albums
Wind-up Records albums
Albums produced by Johnny K
Nu metal albums by Canadian artists